Rajendra Chaudhary is a politician in Uttar Pradesh, India, belonging to the Samajwadi Party, who currently serves as Member of Legislative Council since 2021. He is the Chief Spokesperson of the Samajwadi Party in Uttar Pradesh, and also additionally serves as the party’s state incharge of Uttarakhand. 

Chaudhary served as a Member of the Uttar Pradesh Legislative Assembly in the year 1978 from Bharatiya Kranti Dal, headed by the former Prime Minister Chaudhary Charan Singh, and became the chairperson of UP Agro in 1992. He also served as the Minister of Science and Technology under the Samajwadi Party in the year 2002.

In 2012 he was nominated as the MLC from Uttar Pradesh along with Akhilesh Yadav, and in February 2013 he was appointed a Cabinet Minister in the Akhilesh Yadav ministry. He holds the portfolios for the Jail Ministry and the Food & Civil Supplies Department.

References

Living people
1956 births
Members of the Uttar Pradesh Legislative Council
Indian National Congress politicians
Samajwadi Party politicians